Minocycline, sold under the brand name Minocin among others, is a tetracycline antibiotic medication used to treat a number of bacterial infections such as pneumonia. It is generally (but not always) less preferred than the tetracycline doxycycline. Minocycline is also used for the treatment of acne and rheumatoid arthritis. It is taken by mouth or applied to the skin.

Common side effects include nausea, diarrhea, dizziness, allergic reactions, and kidney problems. Serious side effects may include anaphylaxis, a lupus-like syndrome, and easy sunburning. Use in the later part of pregnancy may harm the baby and safety during breastfeeding is unclear. It works by decreasing a bacterium's ability to make protein thus stopping its growth.

Minocycline was patented in 1961 and came into commercial use in 1971. It is available as a generic medication. In 2020, it was the 236th most commonly prescribed medication in the United States, with more than 1million prescriptions.

Medical uses

Acne
Minocycline and doxycycline are frequently used for the treatment of acne vulgaris. Both of these closely related antibiotics have similar levels of efficacy, although doxycycline has a slightly lower risk of adverse side effects. Historically, minocycline has been an effective treatment for acne vulgaris. However, acne that is caused by antibiotic-resistant bacteria is a growing problem in many countries. In Europe and North America, a number of people with acne no longer respond well to treatment with tetracycline family antibiotics because their acne symptoms are caused by bacteria (primarily Cutibacterium acnes) that are resistant to these antibiotics. In order to reduce resistance rates as well as increase the effectiveness of treatment, oral antibiotics should be generally combined with topical acne creams such as benzoyl peroxide or a retinoid (tretinoin, adapalene, etc.). Minocycline is used in the treatment of acne.

Infections
Minocycline is also used for other skin infections such as methicillin-resistant Staphylococcus aureus.

Although minocycline's broader spectrum of activity, compared with other members of the group, includes activity against Neisseria meningitidis, its use for prophylaxis is no longer recommended because of side effects (dizziness and vertigo).

It may be used to treat certain strains of methicillin-resistant S. aureus infection and a disease caused by drug-resistant Acinetobacter spp.

A list of uses includes:

 Amoebic dysentery
 Anthrax
 Bubonic plague
 Cholera
 Ehrlichiosis
 Gonorrhea (when penicillin cannot be given)
 Gougerot-Carteaud syndrome (confluent and reticulated papillomatosis)
 Hidradenitis suppurativa
 For use as an adjuvant to HAART
 Leprosy
 Periodontal disease
 Perioral dermatitis
 Respiratory infections such as pneumonia
 Rocky Mountain spotted fever
 Rosacea
 Syphilis (when penicillin cannot be given)
 Urinary tract infections, rectal infections, and infections of the cervix caused by certain microbes

Other
Both minocycline and doxycycline have shown effectiveness in asthma due to immune-suppressing effects. Minocycline and doxycycline have modest effectiveness in treating rheumatoid arthritis. However, the 2015 American College of Rheumatology guideline for the treatment of rheumatoid arthritis does not include minocycline.
Recent research indicate that centrally infused minocycline attenuates brain microglial activation, neuroinflammation and sympathetic activation during pulmonary hypertension

Contraindications
The drug is contraindicated in people with known hypersensitivity to tetracycline antibiotics, as there is complete cross sensitivity in this group. It is also contraindicated in people with severe liver impairment and after the 16th week of pregnancy.

Side effects

Minocycline may cause upset stomach, diarrhea, dizziness, unsteadiness, drowsiness, mouth sores, headache, and vomiting. It increases sensitivity to sunlight, and may affect the quality of sleep and rarely causes sleep disorders. It has also been linked to cases of lupus. Prolonged use of minocycline  can lead to blue-gray staining of skin, fingernails, and  scar tissue. This staining is not permanent, but can take a very long time for the skin color to return to normal; however, a muddy brown skin color in sun-exposed areas is usually permanent. Permanent blue discoloration of gums or teeth discoloration may also occur. Rare but serious side effects include fever, yellowing of the eyes or skin, stomach pain, sore throat, vision changes, and mental changes, including depersonalization.

Occasionally, minocycline therapy may result in autoimmune disorders such as drug-related lupus and autoimmune hepatitis, which usually occurs in men who also developed minocycline-induced lupus; however, women are more likely to develop minocycline-induced lupus. Significant or complete recovery occurs in most people who develop minocycline-induced autoimmune problems within a period of a few weeks to a year of cessation of minocycline therapy. Autoimmune problems emerge during chronic therapy, but can sometimes occur after only short courses of a couple of weeks of therapy. Drug reaction with eosinophilia and systemic symptoms  syndrome can occur during the first few weeks of therapy with minocycline.

Minocycline, but not other tetracyclines, can cause vestibular disturbances with dizziness, ataxia, vertigo, and tinnitus. These effects are thought to be related to minocycline's greater penetration into the central nervous system. Vestibular side effects are much more common in women than in men, occurring in 50 to 70% of women receiving minocycline. As a result of the frequency of this bothersome side effect, minocycline is rarely used in female patients.

Symptoms of an allergic reaction include rash, itching, swelling, severe dizziness, and trouble breathing. Minocycline has also been reported to very rarely cause idiopathic intracranial hypertension (pseudotumor cerebri), a side effect also more common in female patients, potentially leading to permanent vision damage if not recognized early and treated.

Contrary to most other tetracycline antibiotics (doxycycline excluded), minocycline may be used in those with kidney disease, but may aggravate systemic lupus erythematosus. It may also trigger or unmask autoimmune hepatitis.

Minocycline can cause the rare condition of secondary intracranial hypertension, which has initial symptoms of headache, visual disturbances, dizziness, vomiting, and confusion. Brain swelling and rheumatoid arthritis are rare side effects of minocycline in some people.

Minocycline, like most tetracyclines, becomes dangerous past its expiration date. While most prescription drugs lose potency after their expiration dates, tetracyclines are known to become toxic over time. Expired tetracyclines can cause serious damage to the kidney due to the formation of a degradation product, anhydro-4-epitetracycline.
Minocycline's absorption is impaired if taken at the same time of day as calcium or iron supplements. Unlike some of the other tetracycline group antibiotics, it can be taken with calcium-rich foods such as milk, although this does reduce the absorption slightly.

Minocycline, like other tetracyclines, is associated with esophageal irritation and ulceration if insufficient fluids are taken with the drug before sleep.

A 2007 study suggested that minocycline harms amyotrophic lateral sclerosis patients. Patients on minocycline declined more rapidly than those on placebo. The mechanism of this side effect is unknown, although a hypothesis is that the drug exacerbated an autoimmune component of the primary disease. The effect does not seem to be dose-dependent because the patients on high doses did not do worse than those on the low doses.

The use of minocycline in acne vulgaris has been associated with skin and gut dysbiosis (see antibiotic misuse).

Interactions
The combination of minocycline with dairy, antacids, calcium and magnesium supplements, iron products, laxatives containing magnesium, or bile acid sequestrants may decrease minocycline's effectiveness by forming chelates. Combining it with isotretinoin, acitretin or other retinoids can increase the risk for intracranial hypertension. Minocycline significantly reduces concentrations of the anti-HIV drug atazanavir in the body.

Pharmacology

Mechanism of action

Pharmacokinetics
Minocycline is quickly and nearly completely absorbed from the upper part of the small intestine. Taking it together with food, including milk, has no relevant influence on resorption. It reaches highest blood plasma concentrations after one to two hours and has a plasma protein binding of 70–75%. The substance penetrates into almost all tissues; very high concentrations are found in the gallbladder and liver. It crosses the blood–brain barrier better than doxycycline and other tetracyclines, reaching therapeutically relevant concentrations in the cerebrospinal fluid and also in inflamed meninges.

Minocycline is inactivated by metabolization in the liver to about 50%. The rest is predominantly excreted into the gut (in part via the gallbladder, in part directly from blood vessels) and eliminated via the feces. About 10–15% are eliminated via the kidneys. The biological half-life is 14–22 (11–26) hours in healthy people, up to 30 hours in those with kidney failure, and significantly longer in those with liver disease.

Chemistry
The drug is used in form of minocycline hydrochloride dihydrate, which is sparingly soluble in water and slightly soluble in ethanol. Minocycline reacts acidic in aqueous solution.

History
Minocycline was patented in 1961 and came into commercial use in 1971. A topical foam for treatment of acne was approved in 2019.

Society and culture

Trade names
Many forms of minocycline are no longer covered by patent, so it is marketed under a variety of trade names:

 Minomycin
 Minostad (in Europe, for the treatment of acne)
 Akamin
 Minocin
 Minoderm
 Cyclimycin
 Arestin (1-mg doses administered locally into periodontal pockets, after scaling and root planing, for treatment of periodontal disease.)
 Aknemin
 Solodyn (extended-release, for the treatment of acne)
 Dynacin
 Sebomin
 Mino-Tabs
 Acnamino
 Minopen (in Japan)
 Maracyn 2 (for treatment of bacterial infections in aquarium fish and amphibians)
 Quatrocin (in Syria)
 Minox (in Ireland)
 Minoz (in India and Romania)
 Divaine (in India)
 Vinocyclin 100 (100-mg dose approved for treatment of acne in Vietnam)
 Dentomycin  (2% minocylcine gel for use in periodontal pockets)
 Amzeeq (4% foam, approved for treatment of acne United States)
 Zilxi (1.5% foam, approved for treatment of rosacea in the United States)
 Cleeravue-M

Society and culture
It is available as a generic medication.

Research
Early research has found a tentative benefit from minocycline in schizophrenia, with several trials underway. A 2014 meta-analysis found minocycline may reduce negative and total symptom scores and was well tolerated.

Research is examining the possible neuroprotective and anti-inflammatory effects of minocycline against the progression of a group of neurodegenerative disorders including multiple sclerosis, rheumatoid arthritis, Huntington's disease, and Parkinson's disease. As mentioned above, minocycline harms ALS patients.

Minocycline is also known to indirectly inhibit inducible nitric oxide synthase.

A trial found no difference between minocycline and placebo in people with Alzheimers' disease. Minocycline also has been used as a "last-ditch" treatment for toxoplasmosis in AIDS patients. Minocycline is somewhat neuroprotective in mouse models of Huntington's disease.

A 2007 study reported the impact of the antibiotic minocycline on clinical and magnetic resonance imaging  (MRI) outcomes and serum immune molecules in 40 MS patients over 24 months of open-label minocycline treatment. Despite a moderately high pretreatment relapse rate in the patient group prior to treatment (1.3/year pre-enrollment; 1.2/year during a three-month baseline period), no relapses occurred between months 6 and 24 on minocycline. Also, despite significant MRI disease-activity pretreatment (19/40 scans had gadolinium-enhancing activity during a three-month run-in), the only patient with gadolinium-enhancing lesions on MRI at 12 and 24 months was on half-dose minocycline. Levels of interleukin-12 (IL-12), which at high levels might antagonize the proinflammatory IL-12 receptor, were elevated over 18 months of treatment, as were levels of soluble vascular cell adhesion molecule-1 (VCAM-1). The activity of matrix metalloproteinase-9 was decreased by treatment. Clinical and MRI outcomes in this study were supported by systemic immunological changes and call for further investigation of minocycline in MS.

The overall antidepressant effect size of minocycline compared to placebo in a meta-analysis was -0.78, indicative of a potential antidepressant effect.

In ongoing research and trial minocycline demonstrated efficacy and seems a promising neuroprotective agent in acute stroke patients, especially in AIS subgroup. Further RCTs are needed to evaluate the efficacy and safety of minocycline among ICH patients.

Data from cellular and animal models
 PARP1 inhibition Ki = 13.8 nM
 Neuroprotection IC50 = 10 nM
 Microglia full inhibition = 20 nM
 Suppression of the mouse's locomotor activity = 0.5 mg/kg

References

External links
 

Anti-acne preparations
Anti-inflammatory agents
Hepatotoxins
Neuroprotective agents
NMDA receptor antagonists
PARP inhibitors
Tetracycline antibiotics
Triketones
Disease-modifying antirheumatic drugs
Wikipedia medicine articles ready to translate